Drew Berry (born 1970) is an American biomedical animator at the Walter and Eliza Hall Institute of Medical Research in Melbourne, Australia. He produces animations of proteins and protein complexes to illustrate cellular and molecular processes.

Education
Berry received a Bachelor of Science (1993) and Master of Science (1995) degrees from the University of Melbourne, and received training in cell biology as well as in light microscopy and electron microscopy.

Career
Since 1995, Berry has been a biomedical animator at the Walter and Eliza Hall Institute of Medical Research. His 3D and 4D animations have focussed on explaining cellular and molecular processes relevant to research conducted at the institute, in fields including molecular biology, malaria, cell death, cancer biology, hematology and immunology.

Berry's animations have received many awards and commendations. His animations which formed part of Harold Varmus' 'Genes and Jazz' presentation were described by The New Yorker as "astonishingly beautiful".  In 2009 American Scientist stated "The admirers of Drew Berry... talk about him the way Cellini talked about Michelangelo."
In 2010, the New York Times claimed "If there is a Steven Spielberg of molecular animation, it is probably Drew Berry"

After collaborating with Berry for the Biophilia animated music app, the musician Björk described Berry as "someone who has made scientifically correct animation of DNA… on this project, he has crossed the line beautifully into the artistic realm where he has animated gorgeous DNA but added some poetic licence... he truly has brought magic to our insides, and shows us that we don’t have to look far for the miracle of nature, it is right inside us!"

Awards and recognition
2004 BAFTA award for DNA Interactive DVD, UK 2004
2005 Emmy Award for DNA documentary series
2005 Maya Master Award
2006 National Science Foundation Science and Engineering Visualization Challenge first place, noninteractive multimedia
2008 Nature Niche Prize
2009 Seed Magazine 'Revolutionary Minds'
2010 MacArthur Fellowship
2016 Honorary Doctor of Technology, Linköping University Sweden

Highlight exhibitions and productions
2003 SIGGRAPH Electronic Theater
2003 "DNA" project Channel 4, PBS and American Museum of Natural History; Five episode "DNA" documentary series, "DNA: The Secret of Life" museum film, "DNAi" DVD, DNAi.org online education portal 
2003 "oZone" Cinema of Tomorrow Experimental Digital Media Art Festival, Pompidou Centre Paris, France
2003 International Genetics Congress 2003 opening ceremony performance, Melbourne, Australia
2003-04 Australian Centre for the Moving Image Federation Square ‘Transfigure’ exhibition, Australia
2004-05 Museum of Modern Art (New York) ‘Premieres’ exhibition
2004-05 Queensland Art Gallery "The Nature Machine" exhibition, Brisbane, Australia
2004-2006 National Academy of Sciences Koshland Science Museum, USA
2005 Visual effects for Doctor Who episode "The End of the World"
2006 Rose Center for Earth and Space, American Museum of Natural History, New York
2006 Shanghai Zendai Museum of Modern Art ‘Strange Attractors’ exhibition, China
2006-07 Forum Kultur und Wirtschaft Düsseldorf, Museum of Design, exhibition on nanotechnology, Germany
2008 20th Century Fox ‘The Day The Earth Stood Still’ visual effects, USA
2008-09 Niche Prize exhibition, The Royal Institute of Great Britain, UK
2008-09 ‘Genes and Jazz’ at the Guggenheim with Harold Varmus
2009 ‘The Cell’  BBC documentary series with Dr Adam Rutherford, UK
2009 ‘200th birthday of Charles Darwin’ exhibition, Museum of Natural History Stuttgart Germany
2009-10 ‘Genome Dome’ exhibition, University of Geneva, Switzerland
2010 Imagine Science Film Festival, New York
2011 TEDxCaltech
2011 TEDxSydney
2011   Björk's Biophilia album Hollow music video and DNA Replication drum machine iPad app
2011 Rochester Institute of Technology "Visionaries in Motion" speaker series
2011 Cold Spring Harbor Laboratory's DNAi.org Spliceosome visualization
2012 Animations for E.O.Wilson's Life on Earth digital textbook
2014 'Virus one billion times' architectural projection show, White Night Melbourne, Australia 
2015 'Mendel: the Legacy' Brno Abbey architectural mapping live concert, Czech Republic
2015 'The Illuminarium' WEHI architectural art installation, Melbourne Australia
2016 'The Malaria Lifecycle' wehi.tv, Australia
2016 'Biomedical Breakthroughs' Melbourne Museum WEHI exhibition, Australia
2018 'The Future Starts Here' V&A South Kensington
2018-22 'Respiration' cell biology animations by wehi.tv  for HHMI BioInteractive 
2022 'Virus one million times' Science Gallery exhibition, Melbourne Australia

References

External links
 WEHI.TV, Walter and Eliza Hall Institute
 Hollow, animation for Björk's Biophilia album, 2011.
 

WEHI staff
Living people
1970 births
University of Melbourne alumni
Information visualization experts
MacArthur Fellows
BAFTA winners (people)
Australian animators
Scientific animators
Primetime Emmy Award winners
News & Documentary Emmy Award winners